Susanna (Sousanna) is one of the women associated with the ministry of Jesus of Nazareth. Susanna is among the women listed in Luke 8 as being one of the women who has been "cured of evil spirits and diseases" and provided for Jesus out of their resources.

And Joanna the wife of Chuza, Herod's steward; and Susanna, and many others, which ministered unto him of their substance.

The name Susanna means "Lily".

Susanna is not included in the Old and Revised Roman Martyrology of the Catholic Church. Although mentioned as a disciple of Jesus, she is not venerated as a saint in the Catholic Church. She is often confused with Saint Susanna, a third century Christian martyr. She is included in the Myrrhbearers by the Eastern Orthodox Church.

References 

Followers of Jesus
Christian saints from the New Testament
1st-century Christian female saints
Women in the New Testament
Gospel of Luke
Myrrhbearers